Sobrado is a municipality in the province of León, Castile and León, Spain.

Municipalities in the Province of León